Cybister cardoni, is a species of predaceous diving beetle found in India, Bangladesh, Myanmar, Pakistan, and Sri Lanka.

References 

Dytiscidae
Insects of Sri Lanka
Insects described in 1890